Flekušek is a settlement in the western part of the Slovene Hills in northeastern Slovenia. It lies in the Municipality of Pesnica. The area is part of the traditional region of Styria. It is now included in the Drava Statistical Region.

References

External links
Flekušek on Geopedia

Populated places in the Municipality of Pesnica